The Canadian federal budget for fiscal year 1995–1996 was presented by Minister of Finance Paul Martin in the House of Commons of Canada on 27 February 1995.

Background
The budget is presented in a context of a fast-growing US economy and moderate inflation but a severe increase in interest rates that started in early 1994 dramatically increased public debt charges and in turn reduced budgetary margin for the Liberal government.

Taxes
The capital gains exemption is maintained for farming and small businesses

Cost recovery initiatives
In order to increase revenues, the budget plans for new cost recovery and user fees initiatives, notably:
 A new immigration fee of $975 per adult ;
 Increased fees for citizenship ;
 Increase in the interest rate charged by Revenue Canada for late payments on taxes, CPP and EI contributions ;
 Increased cost recovery for the provision of consular and trade development services ;
 Introduction of fees for commercial products provided by Environment Canada.

These initiatives were to generate $450 millions in annual revenues in 1995–96 and up to $600 millions when fully implemented.

Expenditures

Program spending

Administrative measures
The budget announces massive cuts to program expenditures, amounting to 18.9 % by 1997–98. A new Expenditure Management System (EMS) was announced prior to the budget announcement on February 15 by Art Eggleton, the President of the Treasury Board. The EMS aimes to implement a new results-based approach to public management and strict cost control.

The 2 $ banknote is discontinued and replaced by a 2 $ coin starting in early 1996.

Other administrative restructuring is also announced in the budget:
 Integration of the Canadian Coast Guard into Fisheries and Oceans Canada ;
 Clarification of responsibilities pertaining to freshwater and marine areas between Fisheries and Oceans Canada and Transport Canada ;
 Elimination of 73 agencies, restructuring of another 47 (by merger or streamlined operations) and abolition of 665 Governor-in-Council positions.

Cuts to business subsidies
The most dramatic cuts are related to subsidies to business organizations, with a scheduled cut amounting to 60.4% between 1994–95 and 1997–98.

 Effective August 1, 1995 the annual subsidy of $560 millions to the railway companies is eliminated ;
 The federal government budgeted a $1.6 billion one-time payment as compensation for land owner whose land values are affected by the abolition of freight subsidies.
 Subsidies for Atlantic region freight are abolished starting on July 1, 1995 ;
 Dairy and other agricultural subsidies are to be reduced by 30% over 2 years ;
 Subsidies to cultural industries are to be reduced, including an-8% reduction in the postal subsidies for Canadian books and magazines.
 Industry Canada is scheduled to terminate 44 of its 54 business subsidies programs.

Transfers to provinces

Creation of the Canada Social Transfer
The budget announced major changes to transfers to provinces. Up until 1995, transfers consisted mostly of:
 Established Programs Financing (EPF) a block transfer established in 1977 to fund post-secondary education and healthcare.
 Canada Assistance Plan (CAP) a cost-sharing program to fund social services and social assistance.
 The Equalization program which was renewed unchanged for five years prior to the 1995 budget.

The budget announced that the first two programs are to be combined into a single block transfer called the Canada Health and Social Transfer (CHST) starting in the fiscal year 1996–97. (In the budget the CHST is designated as Canada Social Transfer (CST) which coincidentally is the name of a successor transfer to the CHST)

Other changes
The Public Utilities Income Tax Transfer Act (PUITTA) is suspended after April 1, 1995 and the PUITTA is repealed on March 31, 1999, providing the federal government with more than $200 millions in annual savings.

Legislative history
Most of the content of the budget was included in the Bill C-76 (An Act to implement certain provisions of the budget tabled in Parliament on February 27, 1995) that was adopted by the House of Commons on 6 June 1995. Reform, Bloc, NDP and one of the two Progressive-conservative (Jean Charest) MPs voted against the budget while Gilles Bernier, the only independent MP at the time, voted in favor like he did for the previous budget. One Liberal MP (Warren Allmand) voted against the budget, protesting budget cuts and was shortly thereafter relieved of his position as chair of the House of Commons Standing Committee on Justice. The bill received royal assent on 22 June 1995.

Notes

References
 
 Budget Speech
 Budget in Brief
 Budget Facts

Canadian budgets
1995 in Canadian law
1995 government budgets
1995 in Canadian politics